is a 2012 Japanese novel written by Keigo Higashino and published by Kadokawa Shoten.

Plot 
In 1980, the Namiya General Store becomes popular with citizens after its owner, Yūji Namiya, accepts people’s advice letters seeking advice for anything troubling them, similar to an agony aunt. When the store is closed, people would drop their letters through a hole in the roll-up door, collected in a mailbox, and would receive a handwritten reply from Namiya in a milk box hung outside. In 2012, three delinquents, Atsuya, Shota and Kohei, take shelter in the abandoned Namiya General Store after committing some petty crimes. Staying until the morning, the boys' pillaging is mysteriously interrupted by an advice letter being dropped through the shutter, although nobody is outside. The letter is addressed to the General Store and traditionally was written by someone to consult about worries. Upon reading it, the boys realise it was written in 1980, 32 years ago. When Kohei decides to reply, the mysteries and secrets of the old General Store comes to light, as their letters transcend time and space to touch a variety of characters, revealing Namiya’s past, and follows the many miracles that intertwine the lives of the seemingly unrelated cast.

Characters

Atsuya 
The leader of the delinquent trio, Atsuya is an orphan who left home. He has a somewhat condescending, cold response to the letters of advice. In the movie, he becomes a nurse after the incident.

Kohei 
Atsuya's childhood friend and fellow orphan, he is sensitive and plays the mediator between Atsuya and Shota. Out of boredom, he triggers the story's chain of events by wholeheartedly replying to the advice letters. In the movie, he becomes a chef after the incident.

Shota 
Atsuya's childhood friend and fellow orphan, he is headstrong and sometimes gets into arguments with Atsuya. In the movie, he becomes an aerospace technician after the incident.

Yūji Namiya 
The benevolent owner and sole manager of Namiya General Store, who takes it upon himself to respond to every troubled letter requesting advice that comes his way. As he struggles with pancreatic cancer, he dedicates the remainder of his life to replying to the letters, hoping that he can change the course of someone's life for the better.

Reception
The novel won the 7th . It has had sales of more than 1.6 million copies in China.

Stage adaptation

2013 edition
It was performed by the theater group Caramel Box at the Sunshine Theater from May 11th to June 2nd, 2013, and at the Shin-Kobe Oriental Theater from June 9th to 16th. Partly double-cast. There were three performances, "Harmonica at dawn", "Civic until morning", and "Pray from the sky", and due to time constraints, "Answer in the milk box" and "Silent prayer in the Beatles" were cut. It was Along with that, there are changes such as the appearance of people who should not appear in that volume. In addition, the gender of Shota was changed to Shoko and Yoshikazu Minazuki was changed to Yoshiko Minazuki.

Cast
 Naoto Tada as  Atsuya Kiryu
 Anri Watanabe as Shoko Ota
 Shunsaku Tsutsui as Kohei Isesaki
 Tomoyuki Hatanaka as Katsuro Matsuoka / Toshinori Namiya (Takayuki's son) / Shigekazu Kozuka.
 Hiroyuki Sato as Takeo Matsuoka / Genta Annaka (100-point kid) / Eisuke Toshima (Senior Managing Director of Little Dog)
 Satsuki Okada as Kanako Matsuoka / Yoriko Namiya / Harumi Muto
 Takako Hayashi as Emiko Matsuoka / Wakana Kawabe (daughter of Midori Kawabe) / Kimiko Kozuka
 Hideaki Suzuki and Yosuke Kezuka as Shigezo Matsuoka (Katsuro's uncle) / Shungo Namiya / Shinji Tomioka
 Aya Maeda as Yoshiko Minazuki / Midori Kawabe
 Kiri Harada as Seri Suwon / Akiko Minazuki
 Ayana Sasagawa and Haruyo Kobayashi as Hiroko Tatebayashi (Minatsuki family maid) / Tatsuyuki Suwon / Hideyo Tamura
 Joji Abe as Shizuto Numata (Messenger of the Minazuki family) / Takayuki Namiya / Soichi Kamiya (Deputy Director)
 Hiroyuki Nishikawa as Yuji Namiya

2016 edition 
It was performed at Zepp Blue Theater Roppongi and Theater BRAVA! As a version of "Nebula Project Pia Theater BRAVA! Presents" from April 21st to May 8th , 2016 . Like the 2013 theater group Caramel Box performance, the script and direction is Yutaka Narui , but this time it is a production performance.

Musical version (2017) 
It was performed by the musical company It's Foleys at Pocket Square The Pocket (Nakano-ku, Tokyo) as a musical version from May 17th to 21st, 2017.

Film adaptations

Japanese film
A Japanese adaptation, of the same name as the novel, directed by Ryūichi Hiroki was released on 23 September 2017.

Cast
Ryosuke Yamada as Atsuya
Nijirō Murakami as Shota
Kanichiro Sato as Kohei
Toshiyuki Nishida as Yūji Namiya
Machiko Ono as Harumi Tamura
Kento Hayashi as Katsuro Matsuoka
Riko Narumi as Akiko Minazuki
Mugi Kadowaki as Seri
Masato Hagiwara as Takayuki Namiya
Kaoru Kobayashi as Takeo Matsuoka
Rio Suzuki as young Seri
Rio Yamashita as Mieko Kawabe
Kazuko Yoshiyuki as Hideyo Tamura
Panta as Yoshikazu Minazuki
Tōru Tezuka as Mr. Kariya

Chinese film

A Chinese adaptation produced by Emperor Motion Pictures and Wanda Media was released on 29 December 2017. It stars Jackie Chan as the titular shop owner.

References

External links
 

2012 Japanese novels
Japanese-language novels
Kadokawa Shoten
Kadokawa Dwango franchises
Novels by Keigo Higashino